The 2014 Champions Tour was the 35th season for the golf tour now known as PGA Tour Champions since it officially began in 1980 as the Senior PGA Tour. The season consisted of 26 official money events with purses totaling $51,650,000, including five majors. Bernhard Langer won five tournaments, including two majors, and led the money list, scoring average list and the Charles Schwab Cup.

Tournament results
The following table shows all the official money events for the 2014 season. "Date" is the ending date of the tournament. The numbers in parentheses after the winners' names are the number of wins they will have on the tour up to and including that event. Senior majors are shown in bold.

Leaders
Scoring Average leaders

Source:

Money List leaders

Source:

Career Money List leaders

Source:

Awards

See also
Champions Tour awards
Champions Tour records

References

External links
PGA Tour Champions official site

PGA Tour Champions seasons
Champions Tour